Hyposmocoma kahaiao is a species of moth of the family Cosmopterigidae. It is endemic to Maui. The species belongs to the amphibious caterpillar guild of the genus Hyposmocoma.

References

K
Endemic moths of Hawaii
Biota of Maui
Moths described in 2011